William J. Cornwell (August 24, 1809 in Stanford, Dutchess County, New York – 1896) was an American lawyer and politician from New York.

Life
He was the son of Eden Burroughs Cornwall (1766–1833) and Thankful (Harrison) Cornwall (c. 1765–1847). He married Marietta Sheldon, and they had three children.

He practiced law in Weedsport, New York.

He was a member of the New York State Assembly (Cayuga Co.) in 1846 and 1847.

He was a member of the New York State Senate (24th D.) in 1848 and 1849.

He was a Canal Appraiser from 1850 to 1855, and Auditor of the Canal Department from 1855 to 1856.

Sources
The New York Civil List compiled by Franklin Benjamin Hough (pages 43f, 136, 140, 231, 233 and 267; Weed, Parsons and Co., 1858)
William Cornwall and His Descendants by Edward Everett Cornwall (1901; pg. 45) [gives surname "Cornwall", but the Civil List and Legislature Journals always spell "Cornwell"]

1809 births
1896 deaths
Members of the New York State Assembly
New York (state) state senators
New York (state) Whigs
19th-century American politicians
People from Stanford, New York
People from Weedsport, New York